Lachesis melanocephala is a venomous pit viper species found in Costa Rica and Panama. No subspecies are currently recognized.

Common names
Common names include black-headed bushmaster,  as well as cascabel muda ("silent rattlesnake") and matabuey in Spanish.

Description

The top of the head is uniform black in color, to which the specific name, melanocephala, and common name refer to.

Geographic range
L. melanocephala is found in Costa Rica on the Pacific versant of southeastern Puntarenas province from near sea level to about 1500 m (about 4,900 feet). It is also found in Finca Hartmann in Panama's Chiriqui Province. The type locality given is "tropical rainforest 9 km northern of Ciudad Neily in southeastern Provincia de Puntarenas, Costa Rica."

Campbell and Lamar (2004) describe its range as southwestern Costa Rica and possibly extreme western Panama, but state that almost all locality records are from Puntarenas province. Savage 2002 and Dwyer and Perez 2009 confirmed its existence in Panama.

References

Further reading
 Solórzano, Alejandro, and Luis Cerdas. 1986. A new subspecies of the bushmaster, Lachesis muta, from southeastern Costa Rica. Journal of Herpetology 20 (3): 463–466. (''Lachesis muta melanocephala")

melanocephala
Snakes of Central America
Reptiles of Costa Rica
Reptiles of Panama
Reptiles described in 1986